L'Italia s'è rotta ("Italy is broken") is a 1976 Italian comedy film directed by Steno.

Plot 
The two Sicilian  Peppe Truzzoliti and Antonio Mancuso decide, after a misadventure with some mafia drug dealers, to leave the cold and racist Turin to return to their native land. With them there is  Domenica, a beautiful girl from Veneto, who had arrived in Turin in search of work but, for a number of setbacks, had been forced into prostitution.

Cast 

Dalila Di Lazzaro: Domenica Chiaregato
Mario Scarpetta: Antonio Mancuso
Teo Teocoli: Peppe Truzzoliti
Enrico Montesano: Roman robber
Mario Carotenuto: Cavalier Amedeo Zerolli
Alberto Lionello: Domenica's uncle
Franca Valeri: Countess Giovanna 
Duilio Del Prete: Censor 
Orazio Orlando: Oronzo 
Clelia Matania: Peppe's mother
Carla Calò:  Antonio's mother
Sergio Di Pinto: Zerolli's son
Marisa Laurito: Rosalia

References

External links

1976 films
Commedia all'italiana
Films directed by Stefano Vanzina
Italian comedy road movies
1970s comedy road movies
Films about internal migration
Films with screenplays by Sergio Donati
Films with screenplays by Luciano Vincenzoni
1976 comedy films
Films set in Turin
1970s Italian films